The Macau women's national ice hockey team is the women's national ice hockey team in Macau.

See also
 Sports in Macau

Women's national ice hockey teams in Asia
Ice hockey
Women's sport in Macau